is a Japanese comedian, television presenter, caster and actor who is the tsukkomi of the comedy duo Cream Stew. His partner is Teppei Arita.

Ueda is represented with Prime and later Natural Eight.

Filmography
To see his appearances as part the comedy duo, see Cream Stew.

Current appearances

Former appearances

TV drama

Film

Anime television

Music videos

Books

Stage

References

External links
 

Japanese male comedians
Japanese impressionists (entertainers)
Japanese television presenters
Japanese male actors
Boxing commentators
Waseda University alumni
People from Kumamoto
1970 births
Living people